Delvar Rural District is in Delvar District of Tangestan County, Bushehr province, Iran. At the census of 2006, its population was 15,109 in 3,476 households; there were 17,903 inhabitants in 4,636 households at the following census of 2011; and in the most recent census of 2016, the population of the rural district was 20,435 in 5,857 households. The largest of its 26 villages was Mohammad Ameri, with 2,499 people.

References 

Rural Districts of Bushehr Province
Populated places in Tangestan County